Yesspeak Live: The Director's Cut is a two-disc DVD concert film from the progressive rock band Yes. It was recorded live on their 2003 European tour. The set features two concerts recorded in Birmingham, England, and the Glastonbury Festival, respectively. The concerts also feature interviews with band members and commentary. Excerpts of these concerts were used throughout the 2004 documentary Yesspeak.

Track listing

Disc one

"Siberian Khatru"
"Magnification"
"Don't Kill the Whale"
"In the Presence Of"
"We Have Heaven"
"South Side of the Sky"
"And You and I"
"To Be Over"
"Clap"
"Show Me"
"Catherine of Aragon/Celtic Jig/Jane Seymour"
"Heart of the Sunrise"
"Long Distance Runaround"
"The Fish (Schindleria Praematurus)"

Disc two

"Awaken"
"I’ve Seen All Good People"
"Roundabout"
Glastonbury Festival
"Siberian Khatru"
"Magnification"
"Don’t Kill the Whale"
"We Have Heaven"
"South Side of the Sky"
"And You and I"
"Heart of the Sunrise"
"Awaken"
"I’ve Seen All Good People"
"Roundabout"

Personnel
 Jon Anderson: Lead Vocals, MIDI Guitar, Harp, and Acoustic Guitar 
 Chris Squire: Bass Guitars, Vocals
 Steve Howe: Acoustic & Electric Guitars, Pedal Steel Guitar, Mandolin, and Vocals 
 Rick Wakeman: Keyboards
 Alan White: Drums, Percussion

Yes (band) video albums
Concert films
2004 live albums
Live video albums
2004 video albums
2000s English-language films